Love Aaj Kal may refer to:
 Love Aaj Kal (2009 film), an Indian Hindi-language romantic comedy-drama film
 Love Aaj Kal (2020 film), an Indian Hindi-language romantic comedy-drama film